Jae R. Ballif (born 1931) was a provost of Brigham Young University (BYU).

Ballif was the son of Ariel S. Ballif and his wife, Artemesia Romney Ballif.  Artemesia was the daughter of George S. Romney and Artemesia Redd and the sister of Marion G. Romney.  Jae's brother Ariel, Jr. was prominent in Utah theater.

Ballif graduated from Brigham Young High School in Provo, Utah, in the Class of 1949.  He then received his bachelor's degree from BYU in 1953, graduating in the same year as his mother, and he joined the BYU faculty in 1962. He received a Ph.D. from U.C.L.A in 1962.

Ballif was the founding dean of the BYU College of Physical and Mathematical Sciences, formed in Fall of 1972.

Ballif was the author of Conceptual Physics along with William E. Dibble.

Ballif is a Latter-day Saint.  In the Church of Jesus Christ of Latter-day Saints he served as a bishop, stake president and stake patriarch. He also wrote In Search of Truth and Love.
From 1977 to 1979, he served as president of the Massachusetts Boston Mission. He later served as a sealer in the Provo Utah Temple.

Ballif contributed the article on the "Restoration of the Melchizedek Priesthood" to the Encyclopedia of Mormonism.

Ballif was provost of BYU from 1979 to 1989, after which he returned to being a member of the school's physics faculty.

References

External links
short bio of Ballif
short bio of Ballif

1931 births
Living people
20th-century Mormon missionaries
American Mormon missionaries in the United States
21st-century American physicists
Brigham Young University alumni
Brigham Young University faculty
Mission presidents (LDS Church)
Romney family
University of California, Los Angeles alumni
American leaders of the Church of Jesus Christ of Latter-day Saints
American Latter Day Saint writers
Patriarchs (LDS Church)
Latter Day Saints from Utah
Brigham Young High School alumni